Przyluski may refer to:


Places

Przyłuski
Przyłuski, Gmina Biała Rawska, central Poland
Przyłuski, Gmina Sadkowice, central Poland

Przyłuki
Przyłuki, Gmina Międzyrzec Podlaski

People
Jean Przyluski (1885–1944), French linguist of polish origin and a scholar of religion and Buddhism
Leon Michał Przyłuski (1789–1865), Polish Roman Catholic Bishop who was Archbishop of Gniezno and Primate of Poland from 1845 to 1865

See also
Przylaski (disambiguation)